Samuel Worthington Dorsey (1811 – October 18, 1875) was an American lawyer, politician, and planter.

Dorsey, son of Hon. Thomas B. Dorsey, chief Judge of the Court of Appeals of the State of Maryland, and of Milcah (Goodwin) Dorsey, was bom in Baltimore in 1811.  He graduated from Yale College in 1830.  He studied law with John Glenn, Esq., in Baltimore, where he was admitted to the bar and engaged in practice for two years, after which he removed to Vicksburg, Miss., and there pursued his profession for about two years longer. During these last years he was also occupied with cotton planting, and he now abandoned his profession, and for the rest of his life was extensively engaged as a planter in Louisiana.

He went to Maryland for a visit in the spring of 1875, intending also to be present in New Haven at the meeting of his Yale class in June. But the threatened overflow of the Mississippi River called him home; he sank under the exposure to which he was subjected, and died, October 18, at his residence in Tensas Parish, La. Dorsey enjoyed the confidence and affection of a wide circle of friends for his high character. He had been Louisiana State Senator for several terms, and was a member of the State Convention which passed the ordinance of secession in 1861, though he took no active part in the struggle which followed, the American Civil War.

He was married in 1853 to Miss Sarah A. Ellis, of Natchez, Miss., who survived him. Mrs. Dorsey was extensively known in the South as an author.

External links

1811 births
1875 deaths
Lawyers from Baltimore
Yale College alumni
Mississippi lawyers
Louisiana state senators
American planters
19th-century American politicians
Politicians from Baltimore
19th-century American lawyers
Dorsey family of Maryland